Marvel Super Heroes Secret Wars, commonly known as Secret Wars, is a 12-issue American comic book crossover limited series published from May 1984 to April 1985 by Marvel Comics. The series was written by Jim Shooter, with art by Mike Zeck and Bob Layton. It was tied in with a toy line of the same name from Mattel.

Publication history
The series was conceived by Marvel Comics' editor-in-chief Jim Shooter. The series was announced as Cosmic Champions in the eleventh issue of the Marvel Age news magazine, cover dated February 1984. The following issue had a cover story on the series, which had been renamed Secret Wars.

Shooter said:

Shooter explained Mattel's input for the series:

Crossover titles include The Amazing Spider-Man #249–252, The Avengers #242–243, Captain America #292, The Incredible Hulk (vol. 2) #294–295, Iron Man #181–183, The Thing #10–22, Fantastic Four #265, Marvel Team-Up #141, The Uncanny X-Men, #178–181. and Thor #341. In 1987, Thor #383 was presented as a previously untold tale from Marvel Superheroes Secret Wars.

Plot

A cosmic entity, the Beyonder, becomes fascinated with Earth's superheroes in the mainstream Marvel universe. He creates "Battleworld", a planet in a distant galaxy, and stocks it with weapons and technology. He teleports groups of heroes and supervillains against their will to Battleword, declaring: "I am from beyond! Slay your enemies and all that you desire shall be yours! Nothing you dream of is impossible for me to accomplish!"

The heroes include the Avengers (Captain America, Captain Marvel, Hawkeye, Iron Man, the She-Hulk, Thor, the Wasp, and the Hulk), three members of the Fantastic Four (Human Torch, Mister Fantastic and the Thing), solo heroes (Spider-Man and Spider-Woman) and the mutant team the X-Men (Colossus, Cyclops, Nightcrawler, Professor X, Rogue, Storm, Wolverine, and Lockheed the Dragon). Magneto is featured as a hero, but immediately becomes non-aligned when the Avengers question his presence. In 2015, Deadpool's Secret Secret Wars revealed that Deadpool was also a chosen hero, but the Wasp accidentally caused the other characters to forget his involvement.

The villains include the Absorbing Man, Doctor Doom, Doctor Octopus, the Enchantress, Kang the Conqueror, Klaw, the Lizard, the Molecule Man, Titania, Ultron, Volcana, and the Wrecking Crew. The cosmic entity Galactus also appears as a villain who immediately becomes a non-aligned entity.

The heroes (the X-Men choose to remain a separate unit) and villains have several skirmishes. Ultron is drained of energy by Galactus, who tries to confront the Beyonder with Doctor Doom, but both are easily defeated. When everyone else reaches Battleworld, Magneto leaves the heroes feeling rejected and Kang (who was later thought to be killed by doom for his acts) blasts Doctor Doom to the heroes' base when he tries to rally the villains. The heroes win the first skirmish, causing the villains to fall back, only to be assaulted by Ultron, having been rebuilt by Doctor Doom. The heroes then attack Magneto, but he captures Wasp and takes her to his fortress where they are trapped by the weather; the X-Men decide to join Magneto. Doom creates villainesses Titania and Volcana, then leads the remaining villains in a successful assault on the heroes and their base, which they bury under a mountain. After Thor and the Enchantress return from elsewhere, Thor vanishes trying to fight the villains. Doom also has Ultron kill Kang as payback.

When the X-Men arrive to fight Magneto, they form an alliance but Wasp leaves. The Hulk is revealed to have saved everyone from the mountain. Thor also returns, having hid his escape with lightning. The heroes find a village brought to Battleworld where Galactus has summoned his ship so he can consume the planet. Everybody fights him. Doom's faction returns and attacks the heroes, while he sneaks onto Galactus' ship and persuades Klaw to join the villains. Professor X has the X-Men fall back and then attack the villains who are attacking volcanoes set off by Cyclops. Colossus falls in love with an alien healer named Zsaji. Wasp befriends the Lizard but is gravely wounded by the Wrecking Crew before being returned to the heroes. The second Spider-Woman, Julia Carpenter, is introduced.

The X-Men win another battle against the villains. Galactus sends Doom back to his base, notices the volcanoes, and tries to fix the planet. Professor X tells Captain America to fight the villains while they take care of Galactus. Zsaji revives Wasp. In the villain's base, Hulk and Thor shows Spider-Man an alien device that they have used to recreate their clothing. Spider-Man finds and wears his black costume for the first time. Galactus begins to devour the planet. Mr. Fantastic suggests they let him, then the Beyonder will take away his eternal hunger, but Captain America and everyone else convinces him against it. Back at the heroes' base, Doctor Doom uses Klaw's body to create a machine that absorbs Galactus' power, even after he absorbs his own ship instead. With his newfound power, Doctor Doom steals the Beyonder's power.

Molecule Man brings the villains to Volcana's apartment on Battleworld then takes the suburb of Denver back to Earth. Doom summons the heroes to his new "Tower of Doom" where he revives Kang and sends him back to own time in front of them and reveals that Galactus was taken away by Nova. He kills all the heroes with a bolt when they refuse to join him and attack. Zsaji revives them at the cost of her life, and they battle Klaw and monsters he created, including Ultron, while Doom's powers go out of control thanks to Klaw convincing him to use them again. While Wasp destroys Ultron and the others take care of the rest, the Beyonder, who had possessed Klaw, takes back his powers and teleports Doom and Klaw away. After Zsaji's funeral, everyone finds out that the energy from the Beyonder that was released have turned Battleworld into a place where wishes are granted. Soon Mr. Fantastic builds a portal that can take everyone home. However, the Thing, having gained the ability to revert to his original human form of Ben Grimm at will, chooses to remain on Battleworld and explores the galaxy for a year.

The next issues of series tie-ins with Secret Wars open right after the return of the Marvel combatants. Immediate developments include: the Thing replaced by the She-Hulk in the Fantastic Four, Spider-Man has a new costume initially unaware that it is actually an alien symbiote (the symbiote would subsequently bond with journalist Eddie Brock, giving birth to the villain known as Venom), Colossus ending his romantic relationship with a heartbroken Kitty Pryde, and the Hulk has an injured leg from Ultron and the savage side is re-emerging (to culminate in a totally animalistic, inarticulate and mindless Hulk in #299–300).

Reception
Secret Wars was a best-seller when it was published in 1984, selling more copies than any other comic in the previous 25 years.  While it was a financial success, it was not well received by critics when it was published, being criticized for its uninspired and juvenile content. An announcement of a sequel series, Secret Wars II, from Carol Kalish, Marvel's Direct Sales Manager at the time, was first met with boos.  Kalish was even quoted saying: "Let's be honest. Secret Wars was crap, right? But did it sell?"

In 2011, IGN listed Secret Wars as one of the best comic book events. Their writers found the action and goofiness of the story to be enjoyable. They also highlighted the effect it had on the Marvel Universe by introducing the symbiote and new characters. In 2011, Alex Zalben of MTV News ranked Secret Wars as the second biggest comic event ever, after only DC Comics' Crisis on Infinite Earths event. Zalben praised Secret Wars story and lasting effect on the Marvel universe, as well as honoring the storyline as the "semi-official first Event Comics ever".

Sequels
One year later, Secret Wars II was published, with the Beyonder visiting Earth and having a tie-in with almost every Marvel comic book written at the time.

Marvel published a third Secret Wars tale written by Steve Englehart and drawn by Keith Pollard within two issues of the Fantastic Four series: the "Secret Wars III'''" story in Fantastic Four #318–319 (September–October 1988).

In 2006, a six issue series entitled Beyond! was published by Marvel. Written by Dwayne McDuffie and illustrated by Scott Kolins, it referred back to the original Secret Wars event with a similar premise as Beyonder again transported superheroes and supervillains of earth to fight on Battleworld. Spider-Man & the Secret Wars, a Marvel Adventures all-ages non-canonical miniseries, was released in 2010. It tells the story from Spider-Man's perspective and features major discrepancies with the original event. These tales include him receiving the Beyonder's power and creating "New Parker City", Spider-Man and the Thing spying on Dr. Doom, and a story featuring Spider-Man's suspicions concerning the Hulk. It was released in conjunction with Avengers & The Infinity Gauntlet and Captain America & The Korvac Saga, similar self-contained, all-ages re-imaginations of past events, that appear to take place in their own separate continuities in the standard "Marvel Adventures" manner.

The four-issue miniseries Deadpool's Secret Secret Wars was released during the 2015 Secret Wars event. It retold the events of the original miniseries from Deadpool's point of view and used retroactive continuity to fix inconsistencies with later stories. In the end, the Wasp accidentally caused everyone to forget his involvement in the storyline, creating the inconsistencies.

Other versions

What If?
Some issues of What If? revolve around the Secret Wars:

 "Brave New World" by Jay Faerber and Gregg Schigiel explored what would happen if the heroes became stranded on Battleworld after Galactus and the Beyonder destroy each other in battle. The battle continues for a while, but after the deaths of Bulldozer, Captain Marvel, Cyclops, Doctor Octopus, Kang, Magneto, and Spider-Woman, both sides declare peace. The Hulk heads into the wilderness to find a way to get everyone back home while Doctor Doom builds a replica of his Latverian castle. The Enchantress disappears, Mister Fantastic somehow dies, and Spider-Man's black costume causes him to turn cold and accelerates his aging to the point of becoming a skeleton. Eventually, some of the inhabitants have children who inherit some of their powers including Bravado (the son of Thor and Enchantress), Chokehold (the daughter of Absorbing Man and Titania), Crusader (the daughter of Captain America and Rogue), Firefly (the son of Human Torch and Wasp), Gator (the son of Lizard), Malefactor (the son of Doctor Doom and Enchantress making him the half-brother of Bravado), Moleculon (the son of Molecule Man and Volcana), Mustang (the son of Hawkeye and She-Hulk), Raze (the son of Wrecker), and Torrent (the son of Storm and Wolverine). By Bravado's 18th birthday, Malefactor disposes of his father and gathers Chokehold, Gator, Klaw, Moleculon, and Raze in a plot to take over Battleworld. Bravado, Crusader, Firefly, Mustang, Torrent, and the heroes and reformed villains defeat them. The Hulk and Doctor Doom (who faked his death when Malefactor attacked him) return to help end the conflict. The Hulk has used 30th century technology from the deceased Kang to create a portal that will take everyone home with the help of Thor's hammer. Uatu soon appears and warns them of the bad thing that will happen if they return to Earth. Though the adults call off the trip, the younger heroes sneak out at night and end up on Earth, which is overrun with Sentinels. The five agree to stay on Earth as the Avengers and liberate Earth. On a related note, these five had appeared in the Destiny War storyline.
 In another alternate universe, Doctor Doom retains the Beyonder's power and takes over the universe.

Secret Wars (2015 comic book)

In May 2015, Marvel published a new Secret Wars miniseries, written by Jonathan Hickman and drawn by Esad Ribić, that picked up from where the "Time Runs Out" storyline running in Avengers and New Avengers at the time had ended. The storyline involved the Marvel Universe combining with other alternate universes, including the Ultimate Universe, as well as the 2099 Universe, to form Battleworld, a world which exhibits aspects of the various universes. The core limited series was nine issues long, and ran for eight months, ending in January 2016. One of the core miniseries, Ultimate End, had ended the Ultimate Marvel imprint after 15 years at the time. Ultimate End is written by Brian Michael Bendis and artist Mark Bagley, the team that began the Ultimate Marvel universe with Ultimate Spider-Man.

Spider-Man: Life Story
In Spider-Man: Life Story, which depicts an alternate version of the Marvel Universe (designated Earth-2447) where characters aged in real time and debuted in the same year as their first issue publications, the Secret Wars began in 1984 when a number of United States-based superheroes were transported to Battleworld during "the Russian War" (the World War III of this reality). Among them was Spider-Man, who received the Venom symbiote/black costume like his Earth-616 counterpart.

In other media
Television
 An abbreviated form of the 1990s "Secret Wars" storyline appeared in the animated television series Spider-Man, in which the Beyonder and Madame Web selected Spider-Man to lead a team of heroes (consisting of himself, the Fantastic Four, Iron Man, Captain America, Storm, and later the Black Cat) against the villains Doctor Octopus, Doctor Doom, Alistair Smythe, the Lizard (who later switched sides), and the Red Skull. The goal was to allegedly determine whether good or evil was stronger but was later revealed after the war that the real goal was to determine which of several alternate Spider-Men was worthy to lead a team to save the multiverse from the twisted Spider-Carnage. One completely written chapter of "Secret Wars" involved Spider-Man finding another black suit and the X-Men, but transporting the X-Men cast to L.A. (where production for the Spider-Man animated series was based) from Canada (where the X-Men animated series was based) was too costly in the previous episodes the X-Men appeared in, so the episode was dropped and only Storm was used for the rest of the chapters of "Secret Wars" due to the fact that Iona Morris (who was the first voice of Storm) lives in L.A. The Hulk and the She-Hulk were not used in these episodes because the Hulk series was on UPN. Furthermore, Quinton Flynn was the only voice actor to reprise his role from the Fantastic Four animated series.
 The fourth season of the animated show Avengers Assemble is titled Avengers: Secret Wars, after the storyline but focuses only on the Avengers. As it turns out, Loki had told a powerful being, who comes to be known as the Beyonder, about Earth's existence. To Loki's dismay, the Beyonder uses the Bifrost Bridge to take various parts of Earth, places across the universe such as Asgard, and other realities including the one where Tony Stark was stranded, and then combines them in order to form Battleworld for his "experiment", taking those who live there with them, including the Avengers. With Iron Man back with them, the Avengers must form an unlikely alliance with Loki to rebuild the Bifrost Bridge and get everyone back to Earth. During the final battle against the Beyonder, Doctor Strange gives Loki the Orb of Agamotto to begin activating the Bifrost Bridge and Thor throws Mjolnir to Jane Foster to save her from the quicksand transforming her into a female Thor. Through their efforts, they finally undo the Beyonder's experiment, but Loki reveals that Doctor Strange giving him the Orb of Agamotto was the purpose of his telling the Beyonder about Earth, and with his new power plans to conquer Asgard, Earth, and other locations. With help from Jane Foster's Thor form, the Avengers defeat Loki, who is consumed by the All Dark. After Thor regains Mjolnir, Odin has a new weapon created for Jane Foster, where her weapon is dubbed Thunderstrike.

Film
A film titled Avengers: Secret Wars is in development and will be released on May 1, 2026. It will be the sixth Avengers film in the Marvel Cinematic Universe.

Video games
The mobile game Marvel Realm of Champions is loosely based on the 1984 Secret Wars storyline.

Literature
In 2016, a novelization of Secret Wars was written by Alex Irvine.

Merchandise
 Mattel released three waves of action figures, vehicles, and accessories in the Secret Wars toy line from 1984 to 1985.
 An original page of the 1984 Marvel Superheroes Secret Wars'', showing Spider-Man wearing the black suit for the first time, was sold by Heritage Auctions in January 2022 for over $3 million.

Collected editions

References

External links
 Secret Wars at Marvel.com

 
1984 in comics
1984 comics debuts
1985 comics endings
Comics set on fictional planets
Crossover comics
Secret Wars